Zoran "Moka" Slavnić (Serbian Cyrillic: Зоран Мока Славнић; born 26 October 1949) is a Serbian retired professional basketball player and coach. He played with Crvena zvezda and with Partizan. One of the best European point guards of all time, he was named one of FIBA's 50 Greatest Players in 1991, and he became a FIBA Hall of Fame player in 2013.

With Crvena zvezda, he won two Yugoslav National Championships, three Yugoslav National Cups, and one FIBA European Cup Winner's Cup. He also won the Spanish League championship with Joventut Badalona. During his basketball career, he played for Crvena zvezda (1967–1977), Joventut Badalona (1977–1979), Šibenka (1979–1981), and Partizan (1981–1982). His head coaches were Ranko Žeravica, Zdravko Kubat, and Mirko Novosel.

Slavnić was one of the rare players who won everything he could in a career with his national team: 3 EuroBaskets (1973, 1975, 1977), the FIBA World Cup (1978), and Summer Olympics gold (1980).

Professional playing career

Club career
Slavnic's biggest successes were achieved in a Red Star Belgrade jersey, as during the 1967–1977 period, he won two Yugoslavia League championships, three Yugoslavian Cups, and the FIBA European Cup Winner's Cup (later renamed FIBA Saporta Cup). Together with Dragan Kapičić, Duci Simonović, and Vladimir Cvetković, he was a member of one of greatest team in Red Star's history. While playing for Joventut, he helped the Spanish side to win the country's Spanish League championship in 1978, for the second time in the club's history. After that, he came back to Yugoslav basketball, playing for Sibenka, and after that, he played with Caserta in the Italian 2nd Division. He finished his playing career in that club, but after a short period in Red Star's biggest rivals, Partizan Belgrade. Together with legendary Yugoslav head coach, professor Aca Nikolić, he's the only person who both played and coached, Red Star and Partizan.

National team career
Slavnić played in 179 games with the senior Yugoslavian national team, and scored 1,465 points. He's one of the rare players with gold medals from the Summer Olympic Games, the FIBA World Cup, and the FIBA EuroBasket. He won three EuroBasket titles, 1973 in Barcelona, 1975 in Belgrade, and 1977 in Liege. He won the gold at the FIBA World Cup, in Manila in 1978, and Olympic gold, in Moscow in 1980.

Coaching career

Clubs
Slavnić coached Šibenka, Partizan Belgrade, Jugoplastika, Malaga, Red Star Belgrade, Dafni, Joventut Badalona, Iraklis, Brose Baskets Bamberg, and Atlas.

Serbian national team
Unanimously, the executive board of the Serbian Basketball Federation, decided on 29 May 2007, that Slavnić should be the head coach of the first senior national team of Serbia; after the state union with Montenegro had ceased to exist. After numerous "thanks, but no thanks" decisions of experienced players, who didn't want to participate at EuroBasket 2007, Slavnić selected Milan Gurović, Marko Jarić, Darko Miličić, and nine debutantes, who later became standard members of the senior Serbian national team. But, due to defeats to Russia, who went on to take the title, then Greece, who were the defending European champions, and won in overtime, and Israel, Serbia were eliminated in the first phase of the continental championship. The Serbian Basketball Federation decided on 26 September 2007, to look for a new head coach.

Miscellaneous
Together with his dribbling, Zoran Slavnić had three moves that were highlights of his career:
 1975 - He scored over his own head against Spain, at the 1975 EuroBasket, in Belgrade,
 1976 - He scored one second before the end of regulation against Italy, and won the game that sent Yugoslavia to the semifinals of the 1976 Summer Olympic Games, in Montreal.
 1977 - He passed the ball like volleyball players do, to Dragan Kićanović, while playing against the Soviet Union, in the finals of the 1977 EuroBasket, in Liege.
 The Spaniards called him, "The Eccentric Genius", due to his original style of play. His personal motto during his playing days was, "This is all just a game."
 1991 - FIBA announced that Slavnić was among the 50 Greatest Players in FIBA History.
 2007 - Serbian authorities announced that Slavnić was among those who would receive "national sports recognition for his contribution to the development and affirmation of sport."
 2013 - FIBA made Slavnić a FIBA Hall of Fame player. Although he was inducted as a player, his career as a head coach was also considered, having trained numerous young players that later went on to become stars, such as Dražen Petrović, Saša Đorđević, Saša Obradović, Toni Kukoč, and Dino Rađa.

Personal life
In June 2022, Slavnić had a hip surgery.

See also 
 KK Crvena zvezda accomplishments and records
 List of Red Star Belgrade basketball coaches
 List of KK Crvena zvezda players with 100 games played
 Yugoslav First Federal Basketball League career stats leaders

References

External links
 FIBA profile

1949 births
Living people
Baloncesto Málaga coaches
Basketball players at the 1976 Summer Olympics
Basketball players at the 1980 Summer Olympics
Brose Baskets coaches
KK Beopetrol/Atlas Beograd coaches
Dafni B.C. coaches
FIBA Hall of Fame inductees
Iraklis Thessaloniki B.C. coaches
Joventut Badalona coaches
Joventut Badalona players
KK Beobanka coaches
KK Crvena zvezda head coaches
KK Crvena zvezda players
KK Partizan coaches
KK Partizan players
KK Šibenik players
KK Šibenik coaches
KK Split coaches
Medalists at the 1976 Summer Olympics
Medalists at the 1980 Summer Olympics
Olympic basketball players of Yugoslavia
Olympic gold medalists for Yugoslavia
Olympic medalists in basketball
Olympic silver medalists for Yugoslavia
Point guards
Serbia national basketball team coaches
Serbian expatriate basketball people in Croatia
Serbian expatriate basketball people in Germany
Serbian expatriate basketball people in Greece
Serbian expatriate basketball people in Italy
Serbian expatriate basketball people in Spain
Serbian men's basketball coaches
Serbian men's basketball players
Basketball players from Belgrade
Yugoslav basketball coaches
Yugoslav men's basketball players
1974 FIBA World Championship players
1978 FIBA World Championship players
FIBA World Championship-winning players